Peleng-i Derya was an Ottoman gunboat that was torpedoed by  in shallow water off Istanbul, Ottoman Empire on 23 May 1915.

Construction 
Peleng-i Derya was laid down in 1889 and launched and completed the following year at the Schiffswerft Germania AG shipyard in Kiel, Germany as part of the  alongside her sister ship Nimet. She conducted her sea trials on 16 May 1896 and had an accidental boiler explosion on 22 May at Eckernförde, Germany.

Early career 
Peleng-i Derya was bought by the Ottoman Navy in September 1896, but the six year old ship had not been equipped yet with any armaments. She was brought to a shipyard in Istanbul to be refitted with her armaments consisting of two  quick-firing (QF) Krupp (K) guns, two  QF K guns, three  QF K guns, four  QF Nordenfelt (N) guns, three machine guns (1906) and three  SK torpedo tubes. As time went on, her condition worsened and she was decommissioned in 1913 before returning to service at the start of the First World War in September 1914.

Sinking 
Peleng-i Derya was anchored in shallow water near Bakırköy Bay at Istanbul on 23 May 1915 when the British submarine  torpedoed her without warning. The ship capsized and sank with the loss of two crew.

Wreck 
The wreck of Peleng-i Derya was broken up in 1920 with some parts still being present to this day.

References

Bibliography
 
 

Gunboats
Naval ships of the Ottoman Empire
1890 ships
Ships built in Kiel
Ships sunk by British submarines
Maritime incidents in 1915
Ships of the Ottoman Navy